The 6th Annual M.A.M.A. Awards were held on January 27, 2017. The TV3 Lithuania network broadcast the show live from Žalgiris Arena in Kaunas. The nominations were announced on December 14, 2016.

Nominees 
Note: Winners are listed in bold.

Best Female Act 
  Erica Jennings
 Ieva Narkutė
 Monika Linkytė
 Ingrida Valinskienė
 GJan

Best Male Act 
  Saulius Prūsaitis
 Merūnas
 Donny Montell
 Daddy Was A Milkman
 Ironvytas

Breakthrough of the Year 
 Daddy Was A Milkman
 Solo ansamblis
 Wolfsome
 Sisters Of Wire
 Liepa Maknavičiūtė

Best Pop Act 
  Erica Jennings
 Donny Montell
  Saulius Prūsaitis
 Lemon Joy
 Merūnas

Best Rock Act 
 Freaks On Floor
 Colors Of Bubbles
 Wolfsome
 Sisters On Wire
 Movo

Best Alternative Act 
 Solo ansamblis
 Deeper Upper
 Without Letters
 Sheep Got Waxed
 Ministry Of Echology

Best Electronic Act 
 Daddy Was A Milkman
 Black Water
 Keymono
 Radistai DJs
 Deep Shoq

Best Hip Hop Act 
 Ironvytas
 Mad Money
 Despotin Fam
 Yga
 Mesijus & Munpauz

Best Band 
 Freaks On Floor
 Colors Of Bubbles
 Lemon Joy
 Lilas & Innomine
 Leon Somov & Jazzu

Best Live Act 
 Marijonas Mikutavičius
 Leon Somov & Jazzu
 Donny Montell
 Merūnas
 Lilas & Innomine

Best Album 
 Waves – Freaks On Floor 
 Muzika – Lietuvai – Merūnas
 #BLCK – Donny Montell
 Roboxai – Solo ansamblis
 Vaikas iš didelės raidės –  Saulius Prūsaitis

Best Song 
 "Norim šokti" –  Saulius Prūsaitis
 "I've Been Waiting For This Night" – Donny Montell
 "Tu privalai skambėt" – Lilas & Innomine
 "Lietuvos istorijos repas" – Šventinis Bankuchenas
 "Gaila" – Leon Somov & Jazzu

References

2017 music awards